Saraya Awliya al-Dam, also referred to by the abbreviation SAD, is a Shi'ite pro-Iran militia based in Iraq. The organization is known for its counter-U.S. operations in Northern Iraq.

In 2021, the group claimed responsibility for the 2021 Erbil rocket attacks, which killed two civilians and injured six more, including an American soldier.

A report by the Washington Institute suggested that they might have connections to  Asaib Ahl al-Haq, an Iraqi Shi'a paramilitary.

History 
SAD has been described as "a relatively new player" in the Iraqi conflict. The first operation of Sarayah Awliya al-Dam occurred on 24 August 2020, when they attacked a group of Iraqi trucks that may have been carrying U.S. goods. The organization confirmed they were responsible.

On 6 January 2021, another attack was launched by SAD on another convoy of trucks.

The day after the 2021 Erbil rocket attacks, SAD claimed responsibility for the airstrikes. It was the most serious attack on the coalition since the Biden administration began. SAD proclaimed:The American occupation will not be safe from our strikes in any inch of the homeland, even in Kurdistan, where we promise we will carry out other qualitative operations.

Foreign relations 
SAD officially supports Iran, and is often classified as an Iranian proxy. Iranian officials have denied allegations by some Iraqi politicians that they have ties to the group. SAD may also have ties to Kataib Hezbollah, which officially backs Iran.

The SAD is generally considered to be at odds with Turkey, and could possibly pose a threat to Turkey–Iran relations in the future. After the Erbil attacks, the SAD announced that they "only targeted American, Turkish, and Israeli occupation bases." The journalist Shelly Kittleson commented:Though many armed groups and others in the country have, for more than a decade, demanded an end to the "American-Israeli occupation", the addition of "Turkish" is significant.

Many commentators have suggested that SAD could be a front for the Popular Mobilization Forces (PMF).

Reports by the Washington Institute suggested that they might have connections to Asaib Ahl al-Haq, an Iraqi Shi'a paramilitary, which is classified as a terrorist organization by the United States.

Criticism 
Many critics have described it as a terrorist group. Other commentators have accused Iran of denying their alleged ties to the SAD.

Social media 
The militia has a Telegram account, which has been repeatedly noted by different news sources.

References 

Militias in Asia
Arab militant groups
Paramilitary forces of Iraq
Khomeinist groups
Axis of Resistance